Bill Narduzzi (February 16, 1936 – February 4, 1988) was an American football player and coach.  He served as the head football coach at  Youngstown State University from 1975 to 1985, compiling a record of 68–51–1. His son, Pat Narduzzi, is the current head football coach at the University of Pittsburgh.

He died on February 4, 1988, at the age of 51 after a relapse in Hodgkin's disease.

Head coaching record

References

External links
 Youngstown State profile

1936 births
1988 deaths
American football ends
American football guards
American football tackles
Brown Bears football coaches
Columbia Lions football coaches
Miami Hurricanes football coaches
Miami RedHawks football players
Pittsburgh Panthers football coaches
Yale Bulldogs football coaches
Youngstown State Penguins football coaches
High school football coaches in Ohio
Deaths from Hodgkin lymphoma
Deaths from cancer in New York (state)